Sareyamou  is a village and commune of the Cercle of Diré in the Tombouctou Region of Mali. The commune contains 11 settlements.

References

External links
.

Communes of Tombouctou Region